Mozammel Hossain Lalu (1942 – 1 September 2014) was a Bangladeshi politician. He was elected a Jatiya Sangsad member from Kurigram-3 constituency winning the September 1996 by-election.

Early life and family
Lalu was born in the early 1940s to a Bengali Muslim family with roots in Dinhata in present-day India. His parents were Mokbul Hossain and Majida Khatun. Mokbul was a lawyer and served as a minister of the erstwhile Maharaja of Cooch Behar. Lalu had eight siblings including the former President of Bangladesh Hussain Muhammad Ershad, politician GM Quader and Merina Rahman. Lalu's son, Hossain Mokbul Shahriar, is a former Jatiya Sangsad member from Rangpur-1.

Career
Lalu served as the assistant general manager of the state-run Janata Bank. Following the arrest of his elder brother Hussain Muhammad Ershad in 1990, Lalu founded and chaired the Free Ershad Council. Lalu was also the cooperative advisor for the Jatiya Party's Central Committee.

References

2014 deaths
Jatiya Party (Ershad) politicians
5th Jatiya Sangsad members
1942 births
Bangladeshi people of Indian descent
People from Cooch Behar district
20th-century Bengalis
21st-century Bengalis